Transmitter Berlin-Britz was a broadcasting facility for medium wave, shortwave and FM on the site of a former tree nursery in Berlin-Britz. It was established in 1946 and until 1993 it was the most important transmitter of RIAS. It was used by Deutschlandradio until 4 September 2013.

This aerial was replaced in 1947 by a  guyed insulated steel framework mast.

Since 1949 the Berlin-Britz transmitter has also been a shortwave transmission facility. A dipole aerial aligned in east–west direction was installed. A second shortwave broadcasting aerial in the form of a dipole with whole length was built in 1983.

A cross dipole aerial for the medium wave frequency 990 kHz was built in 1978 to provide better coverage to the former East Germany for RIAS’ first channel. This aerial for circular polarization radiated vertically in the ionosphere and permitted good reception of RIAS 1 in the entire former East Germany.

See also
List of masts

External links
 
 
 http://www.skyscraperpage.com/diagrams/?b45609
 http://www.skyscraperpage.com/diagrams/?b45610

Radio masts and towers in Germany
Buildings and structures in Berlin
1946 establishments in Germany
Towers completed in 1946